

Thornhill was the 1999 fourth and final studio album by Canadian artists Moxy Früvous.

Track listing
"Half As Much"  – 2:18
"Sad Girl"  – 4:05
"You Can't Be Too Careful"  – 3:24
"I Will Hold On"  – 4:24
"Earthquakes"  – 4:35
"When She Talks"  – 3:15
"Splatter Splatter"  – 3:00
"Independence Day"  – 4:39
"Downsizing"  – 6:56
"Hate Letter"  – 5:02
"If Only You Knew"  – 2:48
"My Poor Generation"  – 3:59

Miscellanea
Thornhill, Ontario is a neighbourhood in the Greater Toronto Area. Three of the four members of Moxy Früvous, Jian Ghomeshi, Murray Foster, and Mike Ford, attended Thornlea Secondary School in Thornhill.

The album art depicts a Schneider Rundfunkwerke AG Direct Connect Stereo System.

References

See also
1999 in music

Moxy Früvous albums
1999 albums